Euphaedra diffusa, the unmarked pink forester, is a butterfly in the family Nymphalidae. It is found in Guinea, Sierra Leone, Liberia, Ivory Coast, Ghana, Togo, Nigeria, Cameroon, Gabon, the Republic of the Congo, the Democratic Republic of the Congo, Uganda, Burundi and Tanzania. The habitat consists of drier forests.

Subspecies
Euphaedra diffusa diffusa (eastern Nigeria, western Cameroon, Gabon, Congo, Democratic Republic of the Congo, Uganda, Burundi, western Tanzania)
Euphaedra diffusa albocoerulea Hecq, 1976 (Guinea, Sierra Leone, Liberia, Ivory Coast, Ghana, Togo, western Nigeria)

References

Butterflies described in 1916
diffusa
Butterflies of Africa